Jérémie Gillmann (born 1976) is a French mountain bike orienteer. At the 2002 World MTB Orienteering Championships in Fontainebleau he won a silver medal in the long distance, and a bronze medal in the sprint. At the 2007 World MTB Orienteering Championships in Nove Mesto na Morave, he won silver medals in the sprint and the middle distance, and a gold medal with the French relay team. Gillmann has won one silver and two bronze medals at the European Championships.

References

External links
 

French orienteers
Male orienteers
French male cyclists
Mountain bike orienteers
Living people
Place of birth missing (living people)
1976 births